Stephen Michael Lewton (born 5 May 1983) is an English professional golfer who plays primarily in Asia. He won the 2014 Mercuries Taiwan Masters on the Asian Tour.

Amateur career
Lewton played college golf in the United States at North Carolina State University from 2002 to 2006, winning twice. He was runner-up in the 2006 European Amateur behind Rory McIlroy.

Professional career
Lewton turned professional in 2008. In 2010 he joined the Challenge Tour, finishing 80th in the season-end standings with a best result of T5. That winter he came through the qualifying school to secure a place on the European Tour; however after a difficult debut season he failed to retain his playing card.

For the 2012 season, he opted to take a place on the Asian Tour after earning his card in qualifying school. He played primarily on the Asian Tour from 2012 to 2017. His best season was 2014 when he won the Mercuries Taiwan Masters and finished tied for 4th place in the Solaire Open.

Amateur wins
2006 Seminole Intercollegiate, Cavalier Classic
2007 New South Wales Medal

Professional wins (6)

Asian Tour wins (1)

Philippine Golf Tour wins (1)

Jamega Pro Golf Tour wins (4)

Team appearances
Amateur
Palmer Cup (representing Europe): 2006 (winners)

See also
2010 European Tour Qualifying School graduates

References

External links

English male golfers
NC State Wolfpack men's golfers
European Tour golfers
Sportspeople from Northampton
Sportspeople from Bedford
1983 births
Living people